The following lists events that happened during 1985 in the Democratic Republic of São Tomé and Príncipe.

Incumbents
President: Manuel Pinto da Costa

Events
30 September: The legislative election took place

Sports
Sporting Praia Cruz won the São Tomé and Príncipe Football Championship

References

 
Years of the 20th century in São Tomé and Príncipe
1980s in São Tomé and Príncipe
São Tomé and Príncipe
São Tomé and Príncipe